Gerard de Rooy (born 21 June 1980 in Eindhoven, Netherlands) is a Dutch truck racer, best known for participating in the Dakar Rally. In the 2009 edition he won three stages. He won the truck category race in 2012 and 2016. He is the son of successful rally raid driver .

Notable results in Dakar Rally

2002
6th trucks overall
2003
DNF (Did not finish) stage 12
2004
3rd trucks overall
2005
5th trucks overall
2006
DNS (Did not start)
2007
1st, Stage 1
DNF stage 7
2009
3rd trucks overall
1st, Stage 2
1st, Stage 4
1st, Stage 8
2011
DNF stage 1
2012
1st truck overall
1st, Stage 2
1st, Stage 4
1st, Stage 5
1st, Stage 7
1st, Stage 12
2013
4th truck overall
1st, Stage 1
1st, Stage 2
1st, Stage 3
1st, Stage 6
1st, Stage 7
1st, Stage 11
2014
2nd truck overall
2015
9th truck overall
2016
1st truck overall
1st, Stage 4
1st, Stage 8
1st, Stage 9

Dakar Rally results

References

External links
Gérard de Rooy, Dakar Rally 2013
Playing marked cards – In Dakar Rally 2012 till 12 stage Team de Rooy have used 420mm suspension travel instead of legalized 300mm. On 13 and 14 stages there was Fairplay. (in Russian, translate needed)

1980 births
Living people
Dutch racing drivers
Sportspeople from Eindhoven
Dakar Rally drivers
Dakar Rally winning drivers
Rally raid truck drivers